Shakopee is a city in and the county seat of Scott County, Minnesota, United States. It is located southwest of Minneapolis. Sited on the south bank bend of the Minnesota River, Shakopee and nearby suburbs comprise the southwest portion of Minneapolis-Saint Paul, the sixteenth-largest metropolitan area in the United States, with 3.7 million people. The population was 43,698 at the 2020 census.

The river bank's Shakopee Historic District contains burial mounds built by prehistoric cultures. In the 18th century, Chief Shakopee of the Mdewakanton Dakota established his village on the east end of this area near the water. Trading led to the city's establishment in the 19th century. Shakopee boomed as a commerce exchange site between river and rail at Murphy's Landing.

Once an isolated city in the Minnesota River Valley, by the 1960s the economy of Shakopee was tied to that of the expanding metropolitan area. Significant growth as a bedroom community occurred after U.S. Highway 169 was realigned in 1996 toward the new Bloomington Ferry Bridge.

The city is known for the Valleyfair amusement park and the Canterbury Park racetrack.

History
Burial mounds along the Minnesota River bluff, located within the present-day Veterans Memorial Park, have been dated between 500 and 2,000 years old.

Nicollet referred to the "Village of the Six," a permanent Dakota village south of the river, as acting as a boundary to the Ojibwa. However, historians have since situated it east of the present downtown. He noted the village and locality was commonly called the "village of the prairie" (published as tinta ottonwe). The Shakopee band lived in summer bark lodges and winter tipis. They followed the changes of the season when they planted their cornfields.

By the Treaty of Traverse des Sioux, the Sioux tribe ceded land in 1851 and many relocated to Chief Shakopee II's village. The latter people had moved south to what was later assigned to them as the current Shakopee-Mdewakanton Indian Reservation in nearby Prior Lake.

In 1851, Thomas A. Holmes established a trading post west of the Dakota and platted Shakopee Village in 1854, named after Chief Shakopee II. The city quickly grew, incorporating in 1857. It surrendered its charter in 1861 due to conflicts in the Dakota War. As tensions lifted, the city incorporated again in 1870. The western end was left in township status and was renamed as Jackson Township, Minnesota in 1861, likely after President Andrew Jackson.

Geography

U.S. Highway 169 and County Highway 101 are two of the main routes in Shakopee. Highway 169 and nearby State Highway 13 connect Shakopee to the rest of the Minneapolis – Saint Paul region. County Highway 101 serves as a major east–west connector route of historic downtown Shakopee.

Demographics

2010 census
As of the census of 2010, there were 37,076 people, 12,772 households, and 9,275 families living in the city. The racial makeup of the city was 77.0% White, 4.3% African American, 1.2% Native American, 10.3% Asian, 4.5% from other races, and 2.7% from two or more races. Hispanic or Latino of any race were 7.8% of the population.

There were 12,772 households, of which 45.5% had children under the age of 18 living with them, 57.1% were married couples living together, 10.5% had a female householder with no husband present, 4.9% had a male householder with no wife present, and 27.4% were non-families. 20.4% of all households were made up of individuals, and 5.7% had someone living alone who was 65 years of age or older. The average household size was 2.83 and the average family size was 3.31.

The median age in the city was 32.2 years. 30.2% of residents were under the age of 18; 6.6% were between the ages of 18 and 24; 37.2% were from 25 to 44; 19.2% were from 45 to 64; and 6.8% were 65 years of age or older. The gender makeup of the city was 48.8% male and 51.2% female.

2000 census
As of the census of 2000, there were 20,568 people, 7,540 households and 5,360 families living in the city. The racial makeup of the city was 91.61% White, 1.33% African American, 0.94% Native American, 2.41% Asian, 0.04% Pacific Islander, 2.14% from other races, and 1.54% from two or more races. Hispanic or Latino of any race were 4.40% of the population.

There were 7,540 households, of which 38.9% had children under the age of 18 living with them, 58.2% were married couples living together, 8.6% had a female householder with no husband present, and 28.9% were non-families. 21.0% of all households were made up of individuals, and 5.7% had someone living alone who was 65 years of age or older. The average household size was 2.66 and the average family size was 3.12.

27.5% of the population were under the age of 18, 8.9% from 18 to 24, 38.8% from 25 to 44, 17.5% from 45 to 64, and 7.4% who were 65 years of age or older. The median age was 32 years. For every 100 females, there were 98.1 males. For every 100 females age 18 and over, there were 94.6 males.

The median household income was $59,137 and the median family income was $66,885 (these figures had risen to $72,523 and $83,235 respectively in a 2007 estimate). Males had a median income of $41,662 versus $32,244 for females. The per capita income for the city was $25,128. About 1.8% of families and 3.5% of the population were below the poverty line, including 3.6% of those under age 18 and 4.4% of those age 65 or over.

Economy

Top employers
According to the city's 2019 Comprehensive Annual Financial Report (CAFR), the top employers in the city are:

Arts and culture

 Valleyfair is an amusement park.
 The Landing is an  historic village located on the Minnesota River, representing Minnesota life from the 1840 to 1890.
 Canterbury Park is a horse racetrack and card club.
 Minnesota Renaissance Festival is an interactive outdoor event that recreates a fictional 16th Century "England-like" fantasy kingdom.
 Downtown Shakopee features numerous boutiques and restaurants, an old-fashioned bakery, Turtle's 1890 Social Center, riverside concerts, and summertime bi-weekly classic car shows.
 Scott County Historical Society Museum features the historic 1908 Stans House.

Government
United States House of Representatives
 Angie Craig (D-MN-2)

State Legislature
 Eric Pratt (R-SD-55) in the Minnesota Senate
 Erik Mortensen (R-HD-55A) in the Minnesota House

Scott County Board of Commissioners
 Barb Weckman Brekke- P-5
 Mike Beard- P-1-4, P-6-8, P-12A, P- 12B
 Dave Beer- P-9-11, P-13

Shakopee City Council
 Matt Lehman - Mayor
 Jay Whiting - Vice Mayor
 Angelica Contreras
 Jim DuLaney 
 Terry Joos

Education
Shakopee Public Schools (ISD 720) include five elementary schools, two middle schools and one senior high school, as well as a couple learning centers. The schools are:

 Red Oak Elementary
 Sun Path Elementary
 Sweeney Elementary
 Eagle Creek Elementary
 Jackson Elementary
 Shakopee West Middle School
 Shakopee East Middle School
 Shakopee High School
 Tokata Learning Center
 Pearson Early Learning Center
 Central Family Center (closed for 2020-2021 School year for renovations)

Shakopee is also the location of the Shakopee Area Catholic Schools.

Living Hope Lutheran School is a Christian Pre-K-8 school of the Wisconsin Evangelical Lutheran Synod in Shakopee.

Shakopee has a campus of the Globe University/Minnesota School of Business, a private career college.

Notable people
 Jamal Abu-Shamala, Jordanian-American basketball player for the Minnesota Golden Gophers
 Jack Bergman, congressman and retired Marine lieutenant general
 Anthony Bonsante, professional boxer and competitor on the reality TV show The Contender.
 Scott Ferrozzo, mixed martial artist who held a 4–2 record.
 Eleanor Gates, playwright
 William Geister member of the Minnesota House of Representatives
 Amy Menke, professional ice hockey player
 Erik Mortensen, member of the Minnesota House of Representatives
 Harrison J. Peck, lawyer, newspaper editor, mayor of Shakopee and member of the Minnesota Senate
 Jason Perkins, professional basketball player
 Andrew Reiner, executive editor of Game Informer and guitarist in The Rapture Twins
 Maurice Stans, 19th United States secretary of commerce
 Christopher Straub, fashion designer and contestant on Project Runway
 Brad Tabke, former member of the Minnesota House of Representatives

In popular culture
 Shakopee celebrates "Derby Days", named for the horse racing tradition of the city's history.
 The Daily Show reported on the then fence-less women's prison in Shakopee, and arguments between citizens wanting or not wanting a fence.
 Shakopee was the setting for a Saturday Night Live sketch in 2012, and in 2013 about the fictitious Shakopee Hip-Hop station 'B108FM'.

References

External links

 City of Shakopee Website

Cities in Scott County, Minnesota
Cities in Minnesota
County seats in Minnesota
Dakota toponyms
1857 establishments in Minnesota Territory
Populated places established in 1857